Luis Adrián Tamés (born 29 August 1960) is a Mexican bobsledder. He competed at the 1988 Winter Olympics and the 1992 Winter Olympics.

References

1960 births
Living people
Mexican male bobsledders
Olympic bobsledders of Mexico
Bobsledders at the 1988 Winter Olympics
Bobsledders at the 1992 Winter Olympics
Place of birth missing (living people)